The Monroe Residential Historic District is a national historic district located at Monroe, Union County, North Carolina.  It encompasses 376 contributing buildings, 1 contributing site, and 4 contributing objects in a predominantly residential section of Monroe.  The district developed between about 1874 and 1940 and includes notable examples of Italianate, Queen Anne, and Classical Revival architecture styles and includes work by architects Wheeler & Stern and by G. Marion Tucker. Notable buildings include the R. V. Houston House, Houston-Redfearn House, the Belk House, J. H. Lee House, M. G. Sheppard House, Elizabeth Friedeman House (c. 1880), former Methodist Parsonage (c. 1886), Gaston Meares House, William E. Cason House, M. G. Sheppard House, and George B. McClellan House.

It was listed on the National Register of Historic Places in 1988.

References

External links
 Description of the Monroe Residential Historic District

Historic districts on the National Register of Historic Places in North Carolina
Italianate architecture in North Carolina
Queen Anne architecture in North Carolina
Neoclassical architecture in North Carolina
Geography of Union County, North Carolina
Buildings and structures in Union County, North Carolina
National Register of Historic Places in Union County, North Carolina